Li Chunyang (born 2 February 1968) is a Chinese former gymnast who competed in the 1988 Summer Olympics and in the 1992 Summer Olympics. He was the 1989 and 1991 world champion on horizontal bar.

References

1968 births
Living people
Chinese male artistic gymnasts
Olympic gymnasts of China
Gymnasts at the 1988 Summer Olympics
Gymnasts at the 1992 Summer Olympics
Olympic silver medalists for China
Olympic medalists in gymnastics
Asian Games medalists in gymnastics
Gymnasts at the 1990 Asian Games
Asian Games gold medalists for China
Asian Games silver medalists for China
Medalists at the 1990 Asian Games
Medalists at the 1992 Summer Olympics
Medalists at the World Artistic Gymnastics Championships
20th-century Chinese people